Bear Creek is a stream in Gentry and Worth counties in the U.S. state of Missouri. It is a tributary of the Middle Fork Grand River.

The confluence is approximately one mile north of Gentry.

Bear Creek received its name from a pioneer incident in which a bear was killed near its course.

See also
List of rivers of Missouri

References

Rivers of Gentry County, Missouri
Rivers of Worth County, Missouri
Rivers of Missouri